Suzana Stamenković is a Serbian singer of pop and folk music.

Career 
During her childhood, she lived in Lastovo and Vladičin Han. Her talent was discovered in elementary school when she performed at various school events and performances throughout the former Yugoslavia. She started to perform officially in 2000 after the birth of her child, David. She performed across Serbia and Montenegro, and in foreign countries with the best orchestras and musicians from the Serbian music scene. Her first song was "Istina" with which she debuted at the international TV festival UTEKS, and won first prize as the best debutant. Her next song was "Prevarena" which won many awards including the best interpretation and composition. She composed the tune for the song. Her third song, "Zakletva", for which she also composed the music, won an award for the best lyrics. This was followed by the pop song "Više nisi kralj", for which she wrote lyrics and composed the tune. She received an award for the best song in modern spirit.

She has performed with many popular Serbian singers, including Milanče Radosavljević, Zorica Brunclik, Boro Drljača, Rade Jorović, Radiša Urošević, Vera Matović and Jelena Jovanović. She currently lives and works in Belgrade.

Discography

Singles 
 "Istina"
 "Prevarena"
 "Zakletva"
 "Više nisi kralj"

References

External links 
 Suzana Stamenković on Facebook
 Suzana Stamenković on YouTube

1978 births
Living people
Musicians from Zrenjanin
Singers from Belgrade
21st-century Serbian women singers
Serbian pop singers